John Winebrenner Rife (August 14, 1846 – April 17, 1908) was a Republican member of the U.S. House of Representatives from Pennsylvania.

Biography
John W. Rife was born in Middletown, Pennsylvania.  He attended the common schools, and learned the trade of tanner.  Rife enlisted July 15, 1864, as a private in Company D, One Hundred and Ninety-fourth Regiment, Pennsylvania Volunteer Infantry, and served until honorably discharged on November 6, 1864.  He served as a member of the city council of Middletown in 1871, and as burgess of Middletown in 1877 and 1878.  He served as a member of the Pennsylvania State House of Representatives in 1885 and 1886.  He served as president of the Middletown & Hummelstown Railroad Co.

Rife was elected as a Republican to the Fifty-first and Fifty-second Congresses.  He was not a candidate for renomination.  He died in Middletown, Pennsylvania.  Interment in Middletown Cemetery.

See also

References
 Retrieved on 2008-02-14
The Political Graveyard

External links

Republican Party members of the Pennsylvania House of Representatives
1846 births
1908 deaths
Union Army soldiers
Pennsylvania city council members
Republican Party members of the United States House of Representatives from Pennsylvania
19th-century American politicians
People from Middletown, Pennsylvania